Erwin Henry Lange (August 12, 1887 – April 24, 1971) was a pitcher for the Chicago Whales professional baseball team in 1914.

External links

1887 births
1971 deaths
Chicago Whales players
Major League Baseball pitchers
Baseball players from Illinois
People from Forest Park, Illinois